The Rosary of the Philosophers (Rosarium philosophorum sive pretiosissimum donum Dei) is a 16th-century alchemical treatise. It was published in 1550 as part II of De Alchimia Opuscula complura veterum philosophorum (Frankfurt). The term rosary in the title is unrelated to the Catholic prayer beads; it refers to a "rose garden", metaphoric of an anthology or collection of wise sayings.

The 1550 print includes a series of 20 woodcuts with German-language captions, plus a title page showing a group of philosophers disputing about the production of the lapis philosophorum.
Some of the woodcut images have precedents in earlier (15th-century) German alchemical literature, especially in the Buch der heiligen Dreifaltigkeit (ca. 1410) which has the direct precedents of woodcuts 10, 17 and 19, allegorical of the complete hieros gamos, nrs. 10 and 17 in the form of the "Hermetic androgyne" and nr. 19 in terms of Christian iconography, showing Mary flanked by the Father, Son and Holy Spirit.

The Artis auriferae, printed in 1572 in Basel, reproduced the 20 illustrations as re-cut woodcuts.
Johann Daniel Mylius'  Philosophia reformata of 1622 also includes the twenty Rosarium images, re-designed in early 17th-century style by Balthazar Swan.

Manuscripts
The Latin text also survives in numerous manuscripts, none of them predating the 1550 print edition.
 
 late 16th century
 Glasgow University Library MS. Ferguson 6.
 British Library Sloane MS 2560.  
 British Library Add MS 29895. 
 Bodleian Library MS. Ashmole 1487.  
 Paris, Bibliothèque Nationale MS. Lat. 7171.  
 Biblioteca Apostolica Vaticana MS. Reg. Lat. 1278.
 Gotha, Forschungsbibliothek MS. Chart. B. 365.
 Darmstadt, Hessiche Landesbibliothek MS. 1049.  
 Kassel, Landesbibliothek MS. 2° Chym. 21.  
 Kassel, Landesbibliothek MS. 4° Chym. 81. 
 Nürnberg, Germanisches Nationalmuseum MS. 16752. [8vo. NW 1482.]  
 Leiden MS. Vossianus Chym. F. 12. (dated 1575)
 Rome, Biblioteca dell'Accademia dei Lincei. MS. Verginelli-Rota 6 (dated 1597)
 Marburg MS. 101. (c. 1600)
 17th century
 Glasgow University Library MS. Ferguson 96. 
 Glasgow University Library MS. Ferguson 149.  
 Getty Center. Manly Palmer Hall MS. 232.  
 St. Gallen, Bibliothek Vadiana MS. 394 a. 
 St. Gallen, Bibliothek Vadiana MS. 394 b.  
 18th century
 Glasgow University Library MS. Ferguson 210.  
 Glasgow University Library MS. Ferguson 29.  
 Glasgow University Library MS. Ferguson 74. 
 Getty Center. Manly Palmer Hall MS. 49.  
 Bibliotheca Philosophica Hermetica MS. 86. 
 19th century
 Bibliotheca Philosophica Hermetica MS. 219.  
 Bibliotheca Philosophica Hermetica MS. 303.  
 London, Wellcome Library MS. 1091.
 London, Wellcome Library MS. 4256.

Translations
The text of  MS Ferguson 210, in Glasgow University Library, is the basis of an English translation that was published in the 18th century. The English translation reproduces the coloured drawings of the Ferguson MS as woodcuts.

There is also a Czech translation, dated to 1578, by  Jaroš Griemiller, kept in the National Library of Prague, Czech Republic. The Czech manuscript reproduces the illustrations as line drawings.

References

External links
 The Rosarium Philosophorum. University of Glasgow.
 Text at The Alchemy Website
 Woodcuts at The Alchemy Website

Alchemical documents
1550 books